Effat Nssar (Arabic:عفت نصار) (born 21 July 1964) is a retired Egyptian football midfielder and current football coach. He is the son of a Kuwaiti father and an Egyptian mother. He played for Zamalek & Masry in Egypt.

Honours

Club
Zamalek SC
Egyptian Premier League: 3
 1988, 1992, 1993
Egypt Cup: 1
 1988
African Cup of Champions Clubs: 2
 1993, 1996
CAF Super Cup: 1
1994
Afro-Asian Club Championship: 1
 1987

References

External links
Effat Nssar at Footballdatabase

1964 births
Living people
Egyptian footballers
Egypt international footballers
Egyptian expatriate footballers
Zamalek SC players
Egyptian Premier League players
Association football midfielders